James Graham  (born 8 July 1982) is a British playwright and screenwriter. His work has been staged throughout the UK and internationally, at theatres including the Bush, Soho Theatre, Clwyd Theatr Cymru and the National Theatre.

Biography
Graham grew up in Mansfield, Nottinghamshire, and was educated at Ashfield Comprehensive School and the University of Hull, where he studied drama.

His first professional play Albert's Boy was produced by the Finborough Theatre in west London, where Graham became playwright-in-residence. His first major play This House was commissioned by the Royal National Theatre, where it was critically and commercially acclaimed, transferred to the larger Olivier Theatre, and was nominated for the Olivier Award for Best New Play. This House was revived in 2016 and ran for two years, first in the West End and then on a national tour. In 2018 Graham won his first Olivier Award, for Labour of Love as best new comedy (his other play Ink was nominated for an Olivier in the same year). He wrote the book for the Broadway musical Finding Neverland, and two of his own plays, Privacy and Ink (for which he received his first Tony Award nomination), transferred to Broadway.

Graham's debut feature film X+Y premiered in 2015, and he has written numerous TV dramas, including the TV films Coalition (which won the Royal Television Society award for Best Single Film) and Brexit: The Uncivil War (nominated for the Primetime Emmy Award for Outstanding Television Movie). In 2019 Graham wrote and executive produced a three-part TV adaptation of his stage play Quiz which aired in 2020.

In June 2018, Graham was elected Fellow of the Royal Society of Literature in its "40 Under 40" initiative.

In January 2019, Graham's life and work was the subject of an in-depth BBC One documentary as part of the Imagine series.

In May 2019, his play This House was voted Play of the Decade in Bloomsbury Publishing's '60 Years of Modern Plays' public vote.

He was appointed Officer of the Order of the British Empire (OBE) in the 2020 New Year Honours for services to drama and young people in British theatre.

In 2022, it was announced that Graham had written the book for a new musical about the life of televangelist Tammy Faye Messner, with Elton John and Jake Shears writing the music. 'Tammy Faye' will open at the Almeida Theatre in October 2022.

His plays are published by Methuen.

Work

Plays
Dear England (2023) (premiering at the National Theatre)
Town Planning in the Apocalypse (2023) (short play written for the National Youth Theatre, performed in February 2023 as part of an all-night showcase of NYT students at the Duke of York's Theatre)
Tammy Faye (2022) (musical about the life of Tammy Faye Messner, co-written with Elton John, premiered at the Almeida Theatre)
Shoot (2021) (short play written for Sky Arts "Play in a Day', performed live at Alexandra Palace and later broadcast on Sky Arts)
Best of Enemies (2021) (premiered at the Young Vic before transferring to the West End)
Bubble (2020) (premiered at the Nottingham Playhouse and was live-streamed online)
Sketching (2018) (premiered at Wilton's Music Hall) 
The Culture (2017) (premiered at the Hull Truck Theatre) 
Quiz (2017) (premiered at the Minerva Theatre, Chichester before transferring to the West End) 
Labour of Love (2017) (premiered at the Noel Coward Theatre) 
Ink (2017) (premiered at the Almeida Theatre before transferring to the West End and then Broadway)
Monster Raving Loony (2016) (premiered at the Theatre Royal, Plymouth)
The Vote (2015) (premiered at the Donmar Warehouse)
The Children's Monologues (2015) (wrote the monologue "Biyonace" for the one-off event at the Royal Court Theatre)
Finding Neverland (2014) (premiered at the A.R.T.)
The Angry Brigade (2014) (premiered at Theatre Royal, Plymouth)
Privacy (2014) (premiered at the Donmar Warehouse before transferring to Broadway)
This House (2012) (premiered at the National Theatre before a national tour)
Sixty Six Books (co-author) (2011) (premiered at the Bush Theatre)
Basset (2010) (National Theatre Connections play)
Relish (2010) (premiered at the Tramshed in Shoreditch)
The Man (2010) (premiered at the Finborough Theatre)
The Whisky Taster (2010) (premiered at the Bush Theatre)
A History of Falling Things (2009) (premiered at the Clwyd Theatr Cymru)
SuddenLossOfDignity.Com (2009) written in collaboration with Zawe Ashton, Joel Horwood, Morgan Lloyd Malcolm and Michelle Terry (premiered at the Bush Theatre)
Tory Boyz (2008) (premiered at the Soho Theatre)
Sons of York (2008) (premiered at the Finborough Theatre)
Little Madam (2007) (premiered at the Finborough Theatre)
Eden's Empire (2006) (premiered at the Finborough Theatre)
Albert's Boy (2005) (premiered at the Finborough Theatre)

Screenwriting
The Way (dystopian drama series for the BBC, filming in 2023 for unknown release date)
Sherwood (2022-) (crime drama series for BBC1)
Quiz (2020) (three-part TV drama series for ITV)
The Crown  (2019) episode 3.6, "Tywysog Cymru"
Brexit: The Uncivil War (2019) (Television film for Channel 4)
Coalition (2015) (Television film for Channel 4)
X+Y (2015) (theatrical film)

References

External links

1982 births
Living people
Officers of the Order of the British Empire
British dramatists and playwrights
British male dramatists and playwrights
British television writers
English television writers
English screenwriters
People from Mansfield
Alumni of the University of Hull
Fellows of the Royal Society of Literature